Crosbyarachne is a genus of  dwarf spiders that was first described by Dmitry Evstratievich Kharitonov in 1937.  it contains only two species: C. bukovskyi and C. silvestris.

See also
 List of Linyphiidae species

References

Araneomorphae genera
Linyphiidae
Taxa named by Dmitry Kharitonov